Dave's Gourmet is a company notable for creating and introducing Dave's Insanity Sauce, which formerly held the title of "world's hottest sauce." The sauce is widely distributed through gourmet hot sauce boutiques and online hot-sauce sites.

History

The original Dave's Insanity Sauce premiered around 1993 and was one of the first sauces to be made directly from capsaicin extract, allowing it to be hotter than the hottest habanero-pepper sauces of the day.  It has been rated at 180,000 Scoville units, compared with 2,500-5,000 for Tabasco sauce. Part of the intrigue behind the sauce name (Insanity) was founder Dave Hirschkop’s wearing of a straitjacket at events promoting his products.

Varieties

The following varieties of Dave's Gourmet sauces are currently available:

Standard sauces

 Cool Cayenne Sauce
 Ginger Peach Hot Sauce
 Hurtin' Jalapeño Sauce
 Hurtin' Habanero Sauce
 Jammin' Jerk Sauce
 Roasted Garlic Hot Sauce
 Roasted Red Pepper & Chipotle Hot Sauce
 Scotch Bonnet Hot Sauce
 Dave’s Steak Sauce
 Temporary Insanity Sauce
 Insanity Sauce
 Total Insanity Sauce
 Ultimate Insanity Sauce
 Ghost Pepper Naga Jolokia Hot Sauce
 Scorpion Sauce
 Carolina Reaper Sauce
 Pink Sauce

References

External links
 
 
 

Hot sauces
Brand name condiments
Condiment companies of the United States